Hanumanthunipadu is a village in the Prakasam district of the Indian state of Andhra Pradesh. It is the headquarters of Hanumanthunipadu mandal (administrative centre) in Kandukur revenue division.

References 

Villages in Prakasam district
Mandal headquarters in Prakasam district